Carl Conrad Albert Wolff (14 November 1814, Neustrelitz – 20 June 1892, Berlin) was a German sculptor, and medallist.

Life and work 
His father was the architect and sculptor Christian Philipp Wolff, who died when Albert was only six. At the age of seventeen, he followed in the footsteps of his older brother and moved to Berlin, where he found a position in the workshop of his father's friend Christian Daniel Rauch and took night classes in anatomical drawing at a local art school. In 1844, he was sent to Carrara (where the best marble could be found) to produce statues for the terrace of Sanssouci.

After two years in Italy, he returned to Berlin, assisting Rauch on a monument of Frederick the Great, but he also worked free-lance, producing a fountain with Countess Anna Raczynska (1823-1906) represented as Hygieia (in Posen) and a marble crucifix for a church in Kamenz. Shortly after, he opened his own workshop. In addition to his larger works, he produced many smaller figures, statuettes and decorations that were widely copied.

In 1866, he was appointed a Professor at the Prussian Academy of Art and had many students who would become well-known, including his own son Martin. He was named an honorary member of the Dresden Academy of Fine Arts in 1881.

Selected major works 
 Equestrian statue of Ernest Augustus, King of Hanover, in Hanover
 Equestrian statue of King Friedrich Wilhelm III with several base figures, in the Lustgarten, Berlin. The statue was unveiled on 16 June 1871. It was melted down for military purposes in 1944. Die Allegorie der Wissenschaft (The Allegory of Science) and Clio – the Muse of History statues survived and are located near St. Nicholas' Church, Berlin.
 Statue of Grand Duke Friedrich Franz I in Ludwigslust.
 Figure, "Löwenkämpfer" (The Lion Fighter), at the Altes Museum. A copy may be seen at the Philadelphia Museum of Art.
 Figure group, "Der Jüngling wird von Athena in neuen Kampf geführt" (Young Man Led to a New Battle by Athena), on the Schlossbrücke (Castle Bridge) in Berlin-Mitte.
 Marble group, "Bacchus with Panther", in the Alte Nationalgalerie.
 Bronze relief of victorious troops at the base of the Berlin Victory Column.
 Bronze group, "Löwe seine Jungen gegen eine Riesenschlange verteidigend" (Lion Defending its Young Against a Giant Snake), on the square in front of the Criminal Justice Building in Moabit. It was later moved to the new Court Building on Wilsnacker Straße.

Illustrations/writings 
 Gallerie bedeutender Leute. (Gallery of Distinguished People) – Düsseldorf : Arnz, 1855. Digitalized online by the University and State Library Düsseldorf.

References

Further reading 
 Thieme-Becker: Allgemeines Lexikon der Bildenden Künstler von der Antike bis zur Gegenwart. Vol.36. Leipzig 1947, pgs.189-190.
 Jutta von Simson: Der Bildhauer Albert Wolff, Berlin 1982, .

External links 

 

1814 births
1892 deaths
Academic staff of the Prussian Academy of Arts
19th-century German sculptors
German male sculptors
19th-century German male artists